L.O.V.E., commonly known as Il Dito (Italian for 'the finger') is a modern sculpture of a hand with all the fingers severed with the exception of the middle finger. The sculpture is located in Piazza degli Affari in (Milan), the square where the Italian stock exchange is located. The name L.O.V.E. is the acronym of Libertà, Odio, Vendetta, Eternità ("Freedom, Hatred, Revenge, Eternity"), symbolized by the obscene gesture. The sculpture, built in 2010, was supposed to remain in the square for just two weeks, but it is still present today. The business community protested against the erection of the sculpture.

The creator, Maurizio Cattelan, never disclosed the exact meaning of the sculpture, stating that the meaning is in the imagination of everyone. The two most common explanations are that it represents an erosion of the Fascist salute and that it is a protest against financial institutions after the financial crisis of 2007–2008. Indeed, the sculpture is in front of the Palazzo Mezzanotte, a building built during fascism and today hosting the Italian stock exchange.

References  

Monuments and memorials in Milan
Italian sculpture
Obscenity controversies in sculpture